Westlake is a suburb of the North Shore in New Zealand's Auckland urban area. It lies eight kilometres to the northwest of the Auckland CBD between the major suburbs of Milford and Glenfield. The name arises from its position on the western shoreline of Lake Pupuke.

Demographics

Westlake had a population of 2,994 at the 2018 New Zealand census, an increase of 198 people (7.1%) since the 2013 census, and an increase of 471 people (18.7%) since the 2006 census. There were 1,104 households, comprising 1,338 males and 1,656 females, giving a sex ratio of 0.81 males per female. The median age was 38.9 years (compared with 37.4 years nationally), with 516 people (17.2%) aged under 15 years, 561 (18.7%) aged 15 to 29, 1,305 (43.6%) aged 30 to 64, and 612 (20.4%) aged 65 or older.

Ethnicities were 55.5% European/Pākehā, 3.3% Māori, 2.1% Pacific peoples, 41.5% Asian, and 3.5% other ethnicities. People may identify with more than one ethnicity.

The percentage of people born overseas was 51.3, compared with 27.1% nationally.

Although some people chose not to answer the census's question about religious affiliation, 45.8% had no religion, 41.3% were Christian, 0.1% had Māori religious beliefs, 2.3% were Hindu, 1.6% were Muslim, 2.3% were Buddhist and 1.1% had other religions.

Of those at least 15 years old, 900 (36.3%) people had a bachelor's or higher degree, and 246 (9.9%) people had no formal qualifications. The median income was $33,500, compared with $31,800 nationally. 501 people (20.2%) earned over $70,000 compared to 17.2% nationally. The employment status of those at least 15 was that 1,164 (47.0%) people were employed full-time, 306 (12.3%) were part-time, and 72 (2.9%) were unemployed.

Education

Westlake High School, which opened in 1958, became Westlake Girls High School in 1962 after Westlake Boys High School opened.

References

Suburbs of Auckland
North Shore, New Zealand
Populated lakeshore places in New Zealand